Spade Ranch may refer to:

 Spade Ranch (Nebraska)
 Spade Ranch (Texas)